Daisyhead & The Mooncrickets Live is a 14-track live recording and the second recording by Daisyhead & The Mooncrickets. This album was recorded live by Andrew Oberste in 1997. This live recording includes a few songs that Dax has never revisited since, like: Ghost of a Ghost, The Skeletal Circus Derails, Riding the Wormhold and Winter Ritual. There is also a few covers included, David Bowie's "Ziggy Stardust" and Iggy Pop's "Neighborhood Threat" being among them. Half (or more) of the song titles are unknown. It's also perhaps the earliest recording of the "Deadboy & the Elephantmen Theme Song," which Riggs would eventually play when he formed a band by that name in late 2000.

Track listing
 "Ghost Of A Ghost" – 2:49
 "The Skeletal Circus Derails" – 2:24
 "Dead Girl" – 2:38
 "Ziggy Stardust (David Bowie)" – 1:42
 "Neighborhood Threat" – 3:19
 "Riding The Wormholes + Winter Ritual" – 7:09
 "Unknown" – 2:01
 "Unknown" – 1:31
 "Rock N Roll Angel" – 1:04
 "Unknown" – 1:04
 "Space Oddity + Seahorses" – 2:57
 "Deadboy And The Elephantmen Theme" – 1:39
 "Unknown" – 1:53
 "Unknown" – 1:24

1997 albums